The Mississippi RiverKings were a professional minor league ice hockey team. The RiverKings were a member of the Southern Professional Hockey League from 2011 to 2018 after playing their first nineteen seasons (1992–2011) in the Central Hockey League. On July 2, 2007, after 15 seasons as the Memphis RiverKings, the team's name was changed to Mississippi RiverKings.

For their first eight seasons, the team played their home games in the Mid-South Coliseum in Memphis, Tennessee. From 2000 to 2018, their home was the Landers Center in Southaven, Mississippi, a suburb of Memphis.

On June 13, 2011, it was announced the RiverKings had left the CHL to join the SPHL.

On May 24, 2018, the RiverKings' ownership announced it had suspended operations for the 2018–19 season while the league searches for new ownership.

Championships

Season-by-season record

Note: GP = Games played, W = Wins, L = Losses, T/OTL = Ties/Overtime losses/Shootout losses, Pts = Points, GF = Goals for, GA = Goals against, PIM = Penalties in minutes

Retired numbers
13 – Don Parsons
31 – Scott Brower
55 – Derek Landmesser

Affiliation
From 2001 to 2006, the RiverKings were affiliated with the Toronto Maple Leafs organization. This involved accepting some players on assignment from the National Hockey League club.

References

External links
 RiverKings.com: Official website

Ice hockey teams in Mississippi
Sports in Southaven, Mississippi
Memphis metropolitan area
Ice hockey clubs established in 1992
1992 establishments in Tennessee
Southern Professional Hockey League teams
2007 establishments in Mississippi
Defunct Central Hockey League teams
2007 disestablishments in Tennessee
Ice hockey clubs disestablished in 2007